The following is a list of governors of the Department of La Guajira, Colombia:

See also

List of Colombian Department Governors

References

External links
 Government of La Guajira

La Guajira
La Guajira
Governors